Łączna  is a village in the administrative district of Gmina Pasłęk, within Elbląg County, Warmian-Masurian Voivodeship, in northern Poland.

It was transferred into Polish control following the Yalta and Tehran Conferences that occurred after World War II

The village has a population of 30.

References

Villages in Elbląg County